The 1983 WFA Cup Final was the 13th final of the WFA Cup, England's primary cup competition for women's football teams. The showpiece event was played under the auspices of the Women's Football Association (WFA).

Match

Doncaster Belles won 3–2 to lift the Cup for the first time.

References

External links
 
 Report at WomensFACup.co.uk

Cup
Women's FA Cup finals
WFA Cup Final